Gerda Krüger-Nieland (born June 22, 1910 in Bremen, died September 21, 2000 in Karlsruhe) was a German lawyer and first senate president at the Federal Court of Justice.

Because of some restrictions, she was not allowed to work as a judge or a lawyer and in 1945, fled to Hamburg and worked there as a lawyer and mainly as a defense lawyer.

Although she had never worked as a judge before, she became a judge in 1951 at the newly established Federal Court of Justice. In 1965, she was appointed as the first woman to the Senate President of the I. Civil Senate of this court,

References

1910 births
2000 deaths
People from Bremen
German women judges
20th-century German judges
20th-century women lawyers
20th-century women judges
Judges of the Federal Court of Justice